The 1979 Minnesota Golden Gophers football team represented the University of Minnesota in the 1979 Big Ten Conference football season. In their first year under head coach Joe Salem, the Golden Gophers compiled a 4–6–1 record and were outscored by their opponents by a combined total of 271 to 264. 
 
Quarterback Mark Carlson received the team's Most Valuable Player award. Free safety Keith Edwards was awarded the Defensive MVP Award. Split End Elmer Bailey was named All-Big Ten first team. Defensive lineman Alan Blanshan and offensive lineman Bill Humphries were named Academic All-Big Ten.

Total attendance for the season was 241,942, which averaged to 40,323. The season high for attendance was against Purdue.

Schedule

Roster

Team players in the NFL

References

Minnesota
Minnesota Golden Gophers football seasons
Minnesota Golden Gophers football